Gran Turismo 2 is a 1999 racing game developed  by Polyphony Digital and published by Sony Computer Entertainment for the PlayStation. It is the sequel to Gran Turismo. It was well-received critically and financially, shipping 1.71 million copies in Japan, 0.02 million in Southeast Asia, 3.96 million in North America, and 3.68 million in Europe for a total of 9.37 million copies as of April 30, 2008, and eventually becoming a Sony Greatest Hits game. The title received an average of 93% in Metacritic's aggregate.

Gameplay
Gran Turismo 2 is a racing game. The player must maneuver an automobile to compete against artificially intelligent drivers on various race tracks. The game uses two different modes: Arcade Mode and Simulation Mode (Gran Turismo Mode in PAL and Japanese versions). In the arcade mode, the player can freely choose vehicles they wish to use, and can enable damage, while the simulation mode requires the player to earn driver's licenses, pay for vehicles, and earn trophies in order to unlock new and returning courses. Gran Turismo 2 features nearly 650 automobiles and 27 racing tracks, including rally tracks.

Compared with Gran Turismo, the gameplay, physics and graphics are very similar: the only real noticeable difference in vehicle dynamics was the brakes, which became much less likely to lock up and cause the vehicle to oversteer.  The major changes are the vastly expanded number of cars, tracks and races in simulation mode. Other differences include that the player can race events separately, if they do not want to enter the whole tournament. The player is no longer able to "qualify" for each race entered.

Development

After the unexpected success of Gran Turismo, lead developer Kazunori Yamauchi planned to make Gran Turismo 2 "an even better product". SCEA's marketing director (Ami Blaire) had high hopes, stating "the overwhelming and continuing popularity of Gran Turismo clearly positions Gran Turismo 2 to be one of the hottest titles available for the holidays and beyond". Jack Tretton (sales vice president of SCEA) had similar enthusiasm, expecting Gran Turismo 2 to "fly off the shelves faster than the original, continuing the momentum of this incredible franchise".

Upon the game's release, players shortly found various errors and glitches. SCEA did not ignore the outcry, and offered a replacement if any problems occurred. For example, in version 1.0 of the NTSC-U version of the game, the maximum attainable completion percentage was 98.2%. Another glitch was that no matter what, even if a player saves the game, cars can disappear from their garage. A third glitch was that certain cars would appear in the wrong races. This was most significant in the 30-lap Trial Mountain endurance race, where a 680 bhp Vector M12 LM edition may appear despite a 295-horsepower entry restriction, effectively making the race nearly impossible to win. The reason for the maximum completion percentage falling short is due to a planned drag racing mode that was never implemented.

The game's soundtrack features the 1998 song "My Favourite Game" by The Cardigans.

Reception

Upon release, Gran Turismo 2 sold 815,430 units in Japan during its first week on sale. It was a bestseller for two months in Japan and the UK. In the United States, it sold more than  units within six weeks, and had sold  units by early 2001. In total, it has sold 9.37 million copies worldwide. Official UK PlayStation Magazine listed the game as the 4th best of all time. It received a "Double Platinum" sales award from the Entertainment and Leisure Software Publishers Association (ELSPA), indicating sales of at least 600,000 copies in the United Kingdom.

Gran Turismo 2 received critical acclaim from review aggregator Metacritic.

GameSpot rated it 8.5 out of 10, recommending it to any gamer, car enthusiast or not, while IGN rated the game a 9.8/10. In Japan, Famitsu gave it a score of 34 out of 40.

Dan Egger of Next Generation rated it four stars out of five, and stated that "The rushed production of this game botched what could have been a near perfect sequel.  As it stands, Gran Turismo 2 is still the best racer ever made.  Imagine what it could have been if Sony hadn't bungled the release".

Gran Turismo 2 was a finalist for the D.I.C.E. Awards for 1999's "Console Racing Game of the Year", which ultimately went to Star Wars Episode I: Racer (for Nintendo 64, Dreamcast, and Game Boy Color).

References

External links
 
 

1999 video games
Gran Turismo (series)
Multiplayer and single-player video games
Off-road racing video games
PlayStation (console) games
PlayStation (console)-only games
Racing simulators
Rally racing video games
Split-screen multiplayer games
Video game sequels
Video games developed in Japan
Video games scored by Masahiro Andoh
Video games set in Colorado
Video games set in California
Video games set in French Polynesia
Video games set in Rome
Video games set in Seattle
Video games set in Switzerland